Gulf Hammock is an unincorporated community in Levy County, Florida, United States. It is near the edge of, and named for, the large wetlands area known as Gulf Hammock.

History
The area that is now the community of Gulf Hammock was settled by 1846, near where a north–south road crossed the Wekiva Run. The crossing was originally called Walker Landing. After the Civil War, freedmen who had formerly been enslaved on plantations in the area bought land and established farms. A hunting lodge, called the Wingate Hotel, was located in the area in the 1870s (the hotel was later converted to a barn).

In the early 20th century, Gulf Hammock was a small community with a post office, a general store and a school. The Otter Creek Lumber Company started operating in the area around 1905. After the Atlantic Coast Line Railroad opened a rail line through the area in 1913, the community moved to a location adjacent to the railroad. In 1916 a post office named "Gunntown" was opened, named for S. J. Gunn. That same year the name of the post office was changed to "Gulf Hammock", which remains in use as of 2021. Grove died in 1927, and the Grove-Dowling company went bankrupt in 1929. All the holdings of Grove-Dowling were bought by the Patterson-McInnis Company in 1930.

In 1929, Gulf Hammock had about 1,500 residents. It was a company town: all of the houses, two (segregated) churches (schools met in the church buildings), hotels, a hospital, the crate factory, a saw mill, a planing mill, a commissary, and a garage and Ford dealership, were owned by the company. The commissary was housed in a  building which also housed offices for company officials and the post office. The commissary was well stocked, attracting customers from other communities in the county. The Orange Blossom Hotel, built in 1927, held Saturday night dances which attracted people from neighboring counties. The company paid the salaries of the doctor and nurses at the hospital, the pharmacist in the commissary, and the white preacher, and sometimes subsidized the salaries of the white teachers, who were employees of the county school board. Patterson-McInnis had about 600 employees through the 1930s. The sawmill had three  steam engines, and produced 125,000 board feet of lumber in 1930. The Georgia-Pacific Company bought Gulf Hammock and the timber lands from Patterson-McInnis in 1940.

Notes

References

Sources

Unincorporated communities in Levy County, Florida
Unincorporated communities in Florida